Patricia Ryan  (born 10 December 1973) is an Irish equestrian.

Career 
At the 2000 Summer Olympics in Sydney she placed fifth in individual eventing. She competed at the 2008 Summer Olympics in Beijing, where she placed 8th in team eventing with the Irish team. She also competed in individual eventing.

Personal life 
Ryan is the wife of Irish equestrian, Michael Ryan, who also competed at the Olympics.

References

1973 births
Living people
Irish female equestrians
Olympic equestrians of Ireland
Equestrians at the 2000 Summer Olympics
Equestrians at the 2008 Summer Olympics
Sportspeople from County Cork
21st-century Irish women